Abercrombie, Tasmania is a rural locality, former town and a parish of Somerset Land District Tasmania.  It is located at -41.930000305S and 147.410003662E.

References

Midlands (Tasmania)
Populated places established in the 19th century
Towns in Tasmania